Kargıcak is a village in Silifke district of Mersin Province, Turkey. The population of the village is 426 as of 2011. The main economic activity is farming. The village produces olives and various fruits like figs and grapes. Kargıcak is on the state highway   and being a convenient stop, small trade contributes to village economy.

References

Villages in Silifke District